Tobe may refer to:

 Tobe, a trademark for ski suits and snowmobile suits
 Tobe, Ehime, a town in Japan
 Tobe ware porcelain from Tobe, Ehime
 Tobe Hooper (1943–2017), American horror film director
 Tobe! Polystars arcade game
 Tobe Sexton (born 1968), American actor
 Tobe Station railway station in Japan
 Keiko Tobe (1957 – 2010), Japanese manga artist 
 Kok Tobe Mountain in Almaty
, Japanese shogi player
 Naoto Tobe (born 1992), Japanese highjumper
 Sunaho Tobe (born 1972), Japanese illustrator
 Tobe Watson (born 1997), Australian footballer
 Tobe, a type of sari worn in Sudan

See also
 To be, an English copula verb
 Toby, male given name
 Tomas Tobé Swedish politician

Japanese-language surnames